Pan-African colours is a term that may refer to two different sets of colours:

 Green, yellow and red, the colours of the flag of Ethiopia, have come to represent the pan-Africanist ideology due to the country's history of having avoided being taken over by a colonial power. Numerous African countries have adopted the colours into their national flags, and they are similarly used as a symbol by many Pan-African organisations and the Rastafari movement.

 Red, black, and green, first introduced by Marcus Garvey in 1920, have also come to represent Pan-Africanism, and are shown on the pan-African flag. These colours have also been incorporated on national flags, and they have sometimes been used to represent black nationalism rather than Pan-Africanism.

Green-yellow-red

Green, yellow, and red are now found on the national flags of many African nations.
The colour combination was borrowed from the flag of Ethiopia. The Ethiopian flag has influenced the flags of many Pan-African organizations and polities. Except for relative brief periods of influence and occupation by the Kingdom of Italy, Ethiopia remained outside European control during the colonial era by defeating the Italian army at the battle of Adwa, Ethiopia, in 1896, ending the Italian protectorate. As a result, the country drew the admiration of many newly independent states in Africa. The adoption of the Ethiopian national colours by many Pan-African entities is a consequence of this. The first African state to adopt a gold, red and green flag upon independence was Ghana in 1957, designed by Theodosia Okoh.

Red-black-green

The Universal Negro Improvement Association and African Communities League (UNIA) founded by Marcus Garvey has a constitution that defines red, black, and green as the Pan-African colours: "red representing the noble blood that unites all people of African ancestry, the colour black for the people, green for the rich land of Africa." The UNIA flag was designated the official colours of Black Africans by the UNIA at its convention in Madison Square Garden on August 13, 1920, in New York City, United States.

Current country flags with the Pan-African symbolism
The following are countries and territories that use one or both sets of Pan-African colours in their official flags:

Non-national flags

Former flags with pan-African colours

Non pan-African flags with pan-African colours
Although the following flags contain a pan-African colour scheme, they were not officially designed to symbolise pan-Africanism. The designs may or may not be influenced by pan-African colours.

Rastafari colours also originate from the Ethiopian flag, but though Rastafari thought harbours pan-African sympathies, its use of the Ethiopian flag is historically rooted in the veneration of former Ethiopian emperor Haile Selassie.

See also
 Flag of Lithuania
 Nordic Cross Flag
 Pan-African flag
 Pan-Arab colours
 Pan-Slavic colours
 Tricolour
Malay tricolour
 United States of Africa

References

 Znamierowski, Alfred (2001). The World Encyclopedia of Flags: The Definitive Guide to International Flags, Banners, Standards and Ensigns. London: Anness Publishing.

African culture
African-American cultural history
Color schemes
Flags by colour
Colours
Rastafari
Symbols of Africa
Colours, Pan-African